The year 1999 in science and technology involved some significant events.

Aeronautics
 February 27 – While trying to circumnavigate the world in a hot air balloon, Colin Prescot and Andy Elson set a new endurance record after being in their balloon for 233 hours and 55 minutes.
 March 3–20 – Bertrand Piccard and Brian Jones successfully complete a non-stop circumnavigation of the world in a hot air balloon.

Astronomy and space exploration

 January 31 – A total penumbral lunar eclipse
 February 7 – Stardust is launched on a mission to collect samples of a comet coma, and return them to Earth.
 February 16 – Annular solar eclipse, visible from Australia.
 July 20 – Mercury program: Liberty Bell 7 is raised from the Atlantic Ocean.
 July 28 – Partial lunar eclipse, visible from Australia, eastern Asia, and western North America.
 July 31 – NASA intentionally crashes the Lunar Prospector spacecraft into the Moon, thus ending its mission to detect frozen water on the moon's surface.
 August 11 – Total solar eclipse, visible from Europe, across the Middle East, and ending in India.
December 16 – The Beethoven Burst (GRB 991216) is one of the most powerful detected Gamma-ray bursts.
 NASA loses two Mars probes, the Mars Climate Orbiter and the Mars Polar Lander.
 The Subaru 8.3 m and Gemini North 8.1 m reflecting telescopes open at the Mauna Kea Observatory in Hawaii.
 The Cetus Dwarf galaxy is discovered.
 M–sigma relation first presented.

Biology
 November 1 – Agreement on the Conservation of African-Eurasian Migratory Waterbirds comes into force.
 Late – Pest-exclusion fence around Zealandia (wildlife sanctuary) in Wellington, New Zealand, completed.
 The bacterium Thiomargarita namibiensis is discovered off the coast of Namibia. At 0.3mm in diameter, it is largest bacteria  discovered.

Chemistry
 Elements 118 and 116 are claimed to be made for the first time. Later retracted when results could not be replicated.

Computer science
 March 26 – The Melissa worm attacks the Internet.
 June –  defines HTTP/1.1, the version of Hypertext Transfer Protocol in common use.
 September 21 – David Bowie's Hours becomes the first complete music album by a major artist available to download over the Internet in advance of the physical release.
 First working 3-qubit NMR computer demonstrated at IBM's Almaden Research Center. First execution of Grover's algorithm.
 Probable date – First emojis introduced, in Japan.

Geology
 January 25 – A 6.0 Richter scale  hits western Colombia, killing at least 1,000.
 August 17 – The 7.6  İzmit earthquake shakes northwestern Turkey with a maximum Mercalli intensity of IX (Violent), leaving 17,118–17,127 dead and 43,953–50,000 injured.

History of science and technology
 Boris Chertok publishes «Ракеты и люди» (Rockets and people), a history of the Soviet rocket program.

Mathematics
 Eric M. Rains and Neil Sloane extend tree counting.
 Thomas Callister Hales proves the honeycomb conjecture.

Paleontology
 First fossil of Kenyanthropus Pliocene hominin discovered in Lake Turkana, Kenya.

Physics
 June 18 – Bulgaria becomes a member of CERN.
 October 25 – Randall–Sundrum model presented by Lisa Randall and Raman Sundrum.

Physiology and medicine
 Huda Zoghbi demonstrates that Rett syndrome is caused by mutations in the gene MECP2.

Telecommunications
 January 19 – The first BlackBerry is released, using the same hardware as the Inter@ctive pager 950, and running on the Mobitex network.

Awards
 Nobel Prizes
 Physics – Gerardus 't Hooft, Martinus J.G. Veltman
 Chemistry – Ahmed H. Zewail
 Medicine – Günter Blobel
 Turing Award: Fred Brooks
 Wollaston Medal for Geology: John Frederick Dewey

Deaths
 February 21 – Gertrude B. Elion (b. 1918), American pharmacologist, Nobel laureate in Physiology or Medicine.
 February 25 – Glenn T. Seaborg (b. 1912), American physical chemist, Nobel laureate in Chemistry.
 March 17 – Herbert E. Grier (b. 1911), American electrical engineer.
 April 28 – Arthur Leonard Schawlow (b. 1921), American physicist, Nobel laureate in Physicist.
 May 8 – Edward Abraham (b. 1913), English biochemist.
 May 26 – Waldo Semon (b. 1898), American inventor.
 July 8 – Pete Conrad (b. 1930), American astronaut.
 November 11 – Vivian Fuchs (b. 1908), English geologist and explorer.
 November 25 – Pierre Bézier (b. 1910), French engineer.

References

 
20th century in science
1990s in science